Zabol University of Medical Science was established in 1960-61 (Anno Hegirae 1380-81).  It is a coeducational, public university, located in Zabol, in the southeast of Iran. It operates under the administration of Iran's Health and Medical Education Ministry. Its programs include Medicine and Health and Science and Technology.  Additional programs include Pharmacology, Toxicology and Emergency Medicine.

The university enrolls slightly over 2,000 undergraduates (circa 2012, A.H. 1433).

University's mission and goals 

The university's goals include respect for social justice, rule of law, human dignity, Islamic culture, individual merit and accountability.

Organizational structure 

 President
 Department of Development and Resources
 Food and Drug Administration
 Department of Health
 Department of Education
 Research and Technology
 Student and Cultural Affairs

Presidential Section 

 Office of Public Relations and International Affairs
 Statistics and Information Management
 Protection
 Selection
 Office of Evaluation and Inspections, Complaints
 Legal Affairs
 Office of the Supreme Leader's Representative
 Board of Trustees

Deputy of Treatment 

 Department of Emergency Medicine
 Amir Al-Momenin Hospital
 Emam Khomeini Hospital
 Seyed Al-Shohada Hospital of Zahak
 32-bed Hospital of Hirmand

Department of Health 

 Zabol City Health Center
 Zahak City Health Center
 City Health Center in Hirmand
 City Health Department of Nimrooz
 Hamoon City Health Center

External links 

 

Universities in Iran
Educational institutions established in 1960
1960 establishments in Iran
Education in Sistan and Baluchestan Province
Buildings and structures in Sistan and Baluchestan Province